American Quartet may refer to:

 American Quartet (novel), a mystery novel by Warren Adler
 String Quartet No. 12 (Dvořák) by Antonín Dvořák, nicknamed the American Quartet
 American Quartet (ensemble), a vocal group that recorded from 1899 to 1925
 A band led by jazz pianist Keith Jarrett in the 1970s

Also:
The American Quartette, a 1920s vocal quartet